Sturmer may refer to:

Sturmer (comics), a fictional character in DC Comics
Sturmer, Essex, a village in England
Sturmer railway station
Sturmer Pippin, an apple cultivar
Andy Sturmer (born 1965), American singer-songwriter and music producer
Ian Sturmer (born 1991), English cricketer
Manfred Sturmer, a fictional classical musician invented by Michael Berkeley for a humorous BBC radio programme

See also
Stürmer (disambiguation)